"She's Playing Hard to Forget" is a song written by Keith Stegall and Elroy Kahanek, and recorded by American country music artist Eddy Raven.  It was released in June 1982 as the fourth single from the album Desperate Dreams.  The song reached #10 on the Billboard Hot Country Singles & Tracks chart.

Chart performance

References

1982 singles
1982 songs
Eddy Raven songs
Songs written by Elroy Kahanek
Songs written by Keith Stegall
Song recordings produced by Jimmy Bowen
Elektra Records singles